TG Millner Field is in the North West Sydney suburb of Marsfield, New South Wales, Australia, and is currently the home ground of Eastwood Rugby Club, a rugby union Club that competes in the Shute Shield competition.

History
In 1954, Vimiera Recreation Grounds, a company associated with Eastwood Rugby, purchased 7 acres of land on Vimiera Rd about a mile and a half north-east of Eastwood railway station for the construction of a sporting complex for Eastwood Rugby. At the time sporting clubs only had access to fields owned and maintained by suburban councils and this purchase was made possible by a loan from Colonel Tom Millner MC VD. The clubhouse and oval were built by volunteers and after 1963 and the development of dressing rooms, all home games were played at Marsfield.

The complex originally had 3 full sized playing fields which have been floodlit since 1969 and which were available for games and training. The grandstand was also constructed in 1969.

During the 1990s the North Ryde Soccer Football Club played at the TG Millner Field for a number of years.

In 2000 Vimiera Recreation Grounds, the owners of T G Millner, signed a 99-year lease with North Ryde RSL Community Club which transferred control over the entire complex to the RSL. Following this transfer a number of changes occurred which included the RSL prohibiting rugby being played on the third field

In 2017, VRG advised that the entire complex had been sold to North Ryde RSL.

On August 25, 2020 Ryde Council decided not to proceed with heritage listing T.G. Millner Field.

In June 2022, North Ryde RSL the owners of TG Millner announced that an application had been lodged with Ryde Council to "renew the TG Millner Field site by creating 132 low-rise, diverse homes and a new public park for the local community."

References

Sports venues in Sydney
Soccer venues in Sydney
Rugby league stadiums in Australia
Rugby union stadiums in Australia
Marsfield, New South Wales